Akalın is a Turkish name and may refer to:

Surname
 Berk Akalın (born 1995), Turkish ice dancer
 Besim Ömer Akalın (1862–1940), Turkish physician
 Demet Akalın (born 1972), Turkish pop singer
 Kaan Akalın (born 1997), Turkish musician
 Şükrü Halûk Akalın (born 1956), Turkish academic and civil servant
 Turan Akalın (born 1984), Turkish wheelchair tennis player and wheelchaircurler

Place name
 Akalın, Hasankeyf, a village in Hasankeyf district of Batman Province, Turkey
 Akalın, Kahta, a village in Kahta district of Adıyaman Province, Turkey

Turkish-language surnames